"I'm Not"/"Comfy in Nautica" is the first solo single by Animal Collective member Panda Bear, released in 2005. The single is a double A-side, and both tracks appear on Panda Bear's third album, Person Pitch (2007). The song "I'm Not" samples the rondeau Rose, liz, printemps, verdure by Guillaume de Machaut, recorded by the early music vocal group Gothic Voices (on their album The Mirror of Narcissus). "Comfy in Nautica", which contains a sample of the song "Jisas Yu Holem Hand Blong Mi" from The Thin Red Line soundtrack, was #74 on Rolling Stones list of the 100 Best Songs of 2007.

Track listing
 "I'm Not"
 "Comfy in Nautica"

References

2005 songs
2005 debut singles
Panda Bear (musician) songs